The 2017 FIM Motocross World Championship was the 61st FIM Motocross World Championship season. It included 20 events, starting at Losail in Qatar on 25 February, and ending at Villars-sous-Écot in France on 17 September.
In the main MXGP class, Tim Gajser was the defending champion after taking his first title in 2016. In the MX2 class, Jeffrey Herlings was the 2016 champion, but he moved up to the MXGP class after taking his third MX2 title.

Race calendar and results
A 20-round calendar for the 2017 season was announced on 15 October 2016.

MXGP

MX2

MXGP

Entry List

Riders Championship

Manufacturers Championship

MX2

Entry List

Riders Championship

Manufacturers Championship

See also
 2017 FIM Women's Motocross World Championship
 2017 European Motocross Championship
 2017 AMA National Motocross Championship
 2017 British Motocross Championship

References

External links

 
2017
2017 in motorcycle sport